Shayama Chona (born 12 August 1942) is the Founder-President of Tamana Association (established. 1984) and the former Principal of Delhi Public School, R. K. Puram. In 1997, she was presented with the National Award for Individual for Best Work Done in The Cause of the Disabled. Under her leadership as President of the Governing Council, Tamana Association received the First Mother Teresa Award for its dedicated services to the intellectually impaired.

She has also been awarded the Padma Bhushan in 2008 and Padma Shri in 1999.

Personal life

Tamana Association was conceived on the basis of the name, "Tamana", her daughter, who was born with cerebral palsy. The first centre, Tamana Special School was inaugurated by Her Royal Highness, Diana, Princess of Wales, on 12 February 1992.

Awards and recognition
 2008: Awarded the Padma Bhushan in 2008
 1999: Received Padma Shri in 1999

References

External links
 Tamana Official website

1942 births
Living people
Heads of schools in India
Activists from Rajasthan
20th-century Indian educational theorists
Indian disability rights activists
Recipients of the Padma Shri in literature & education
Recipients of the Padma Bhushan in literature & education